Michael Merritt may refer to:

 Mike Merritt (musician) (born 1955), American bassist
 Michael Merritt (American football) (born 1984), American football tight end